Cambridge International Center (CIC) is a group of six high schools in Shanghai, China. CIC is set up to teach for international students; all teachers are foreign, and the curriculum uses textbooks and other resources from the United Kingdom.

High schools in Shanghai